Eleanor of Normandy (c. 1012 - 1071) was Countess of Flanders by marriage to Baldwin IV of Flanders. 

She was born between 1011 and 1013 in Normandy, the daughter of Richard II, Duke of Normandy and Judith of Brittany. Eleanor had two sisters and three brothers, including Robert I, Duke of Normandy, father of William the Conqueror. In 1017, when Eleanor was still a child, her mother Judith died. Duke Richard married Poppa of Envermeu, by whom he had two more sons.

In 1031 she married, as his second wife, Baldwin IV, Count of Flanders, who was about 30 years her senior. He had a son and heir, Baldwin, by his first marriage to Ogive of Luxembourg. Eleanor was styled Countess of Flanders upon her marriage to Baldwin, and together they had one daughter:

 Judith (1033 – 5 March 1094), married firstly Tostig Godwinson, Earl of Northumbria, by whom she allegedly had issue; and secondly Welf I, Duke of Bavaria, by whom she had surviving issue.

Eleanor died in Flanders sometime after 1071. Her husband had died in 1035, two years after the birth of their only child.

Despite her common nomenclature it is not certain that Eleanor was her proper name. Eleanor of Aquitaine, who lived a century later (and married as her second husband Henry II of England, the great-great-grandson of Eleanor of Normandy's brother Robert), is the first individual in recorded history known to bear the name Eleanor.

References

1010s births
1071 deaths
Countesses of Flanders
11th-century French people
11th-century French women
11th-century Normans
11th-century Norman women